Lavar Clark or Divine Justice Allah, better known by his stage name Ill Conscious, is an American rapper from Baltimore, MD.  He has been featured on a number of various hip hop blogs and has been called a mix between a later-in-his-career AZ, a Capital Punishment Big Pun, with the ‘consciousness’ of Talib Kweli and the passion/word choice of Tupac

Discography
Mixtapes
 Bloody Conscious Vol. I (2005)
 Bmore State of Mind Vol. II (2006)
 Above the Influence (2008)
 The Underachiever (2010)

Albums 

 The Essence (Spring) (2014)
 Logistix (2019)

Videos

References

Rappers from Baltimore
Living people
21st-century American rappers
Year of birth missing (living people)
African-American male rappers
21st-century American male musicians
21st-century African-American musicians